Grim Reaper is a 2007 slasher film directed by Michael Feifer, which stars Cherish Lee, Brent Fidler, Benjamin Pitts, and Adam Fortin as the title character.

Plot
Stripper Rachel is hit by a cab but survives in the emergency room of a hospital. However, she sees Death chasing her, but she does not succeed in convincing the nurses. She is drugged and wakes up in St. Joseph, a mental hospital administrated by Dr. Brown. She finds five other inmates that had a near death experience and also claim that Death is coming for them, but Dr. Brown tells them that they are subject of a mass hypnosis experiment. Meanwhile, Rachel's boyfriend and student of medicine Liam seeks her nearby the night-club. While trying to escape from the facility, Rachel discloses the truth about Dr. Brown and St. Joseph.

Cast
 Cherish Lee as Rachel
 Brent Fidler as Dr. Brown
 Benjamin Pitts as Liam
 Adam Fortin as the Grim Reaper
 Nick Mathis as Nick
 Rebekah Brandes as Katie
 Turiya Dawn as Tia
 Peter Bisson as Pete
 Mike Korich as Stuart
 James C. Burns as Homeless Man
 Caia Coley as Karen
 Jay Wilkins as Paramedic
 Serdar Kalsin	as Cab Driver
 Alice Ensor as Nurse Hill
 J.D. Head as Bubba

Release

The film was released direct-to-video in Canada and the United States on January 16, 2007 by Maple Pictures and Lionsgate respectively.

Reception

Critical reception for the film has been negative.

Christopher Armstead from Film Critics United.com gave the film a negative review criticizing the film's poor execution, calling it "dull" and 'slow moving'.

Rick L. Blalock from Terror Hook.com awarded the film a score of 2 / 10 stating, "Well, I can't say I am surprised by how much I didn't like this film - I kind of expected it but was hoping for the best. This film to be honest is one slasher film I found myself bored with rather quickly".

Absolute Horror awarded the film a score of 2 / 4, stating, "Sadly, what really might have saved GRIM REAPER and its vaguely original idea was some good execution, something in very short supply here".

References

External links
 
 

2007 films
American slasher films
2007 horror films
Films directed by Michael Feifer
American supernatural horror films
Films about personifications of death
2000s English-language films
2000s American films